Spine Tingler! The William Castle Story is a 2007 American biographical documentary film directed by Jeffrey Schwarz about legendary Hollywood showman William Castle, who specialized in producing low-budget shockers.

Production 
Hailed as a "fittingly lively portrait"  of its subject, the film features interviews with Castle's daughter Terry, John Waters, Joe Dante, John Landis, Leonard Maltin, Roger Corman, John Badham, Diane Baker, and Marcel Marceau, among others.

Release 
Spine Tingler! premiered at the 2007 American Film Institute's AFI Fest and was awarded the Audience Award for Best Documentary. It received many other festival honors  and was released as part of the William Castle box set in 2009 by Sony Pictures Home Entertainment. In 2011 the film was released as a stand-alone Special Edition DVD and is currently streaming on Vimeo. It has aired on The Documentary Channel and TCM.

References

External links
Spine Tingler! The William Castle Story
Spine Tingler! on IMDB

2007 films
2007 documentary films
Documentary films about film directors and producers
American documentary films
Biographical documentary films
Films directed by Jeffrey Schwarz
Documentary films about LGBT topics
2000s English-language films
2000s American films